is a Japanese bookstore chain operated by , founded in 1927, with its first store located in Shinjuku, Tokyo, Japan.
Its name translates to "Bookstore of Kii Province". The company has its headquarters in Meguro, Tokyo.

One of the company's goals has been to cater to the interests of not only local Japanese clients, but to a wider, more diverse clientele. This is why its international bookstores have focused on supplying a wide range of both Japanese and English books.

History
Kinokuniya was originally a lumber and charcoal dealer in Yotsuya; and after the 1923 Great Kantō earthquake, the business was moved westward to a new location in Shinjuku, where it was refashioned into a book store by former president Moichi Tanabe, opening with a staff of five in January 1927. He named it after Kii Province, given that his ancestor was a servant of the Kii-Tokugawa family; they are not related to the Edo Period merchant Kinokuniya Bunzaemon. On the second floor was an art gallery.

The building burnt down in May 1945 during an air raid, but reopened in December 1945. Over the next few years, more Kinokuniya shops opened around Japan. In 1964, headquarters was established in Shinjuku (the current Shinjuku Main Store Building). The bookstore was nine stories and had two underground floors.

In 2016, a document revealing discriminatory hiring practices by the company in the 1980s surfaced when it was published by trade unions.

The company owns the Kinokuniya building of San Francisco's Japan Center mall and has drawn criticism for continuing to charge tenants full rent during the COVID-19 pandemic, putting businesses in San Francisco's historic Japantown at risk.

Store
Kinokuniya is the largest bookstore chain in Japan, with 56 shops around the country, in cities such as Tokyo, Osaka and Fukuoka. Overall, it has more than 80 stores in Japan and overseas.

Its first overseas store opened in San Francisco in 1969. Several other bookstores have since opened in the  United States, in cities including Los Angeles and New York. It then ventured into the Asia-Pacific market, opening its first store in Singapore (Liang Court Store) in 1983. Shops in Taiwan, Indonesia, Malaysia, and Thailand followed suit. In 1996, Kinokuniya launched the first outlet in Australia, located in Sydney's Neutral Bay. It later moved to its present location in George Street in the Central Business District.

Since 2000, Kinokuniya in the US has capitalized on the growing popularity of Japanese TV / anime by stocking both English- and Japanese-language books and manga, as well as other Japanese TV / anime-related paraphernalia. The New York City branch in Rockefeller Center was the best-known, encompassing, lengthwise, an entire city block. A new store has recently opened on Avenue of the Americas, near Bryant Park, replacing the old store, which closed at the end of 2007. The bookstore located at 1073 Sixth Ave includes three floors. Along with manga and anime, the top floor has an in-store cafe with products from nearby Cafe Zaiya, where customers are offered a range of bubble teas, cakes, sandwiches and bento boxes. The middle floor concentrates on English books of all types, while the basement level houses Japanese books and magazines, as well as a wide variety of stationery.

Books Kinokuniya is known for the immense size of its bookshops. For more than 10 years in its store in Ngee Ann City, Singapore, was the largest bookshop in South East Asia, until the opening of the new Gramedia flagship store in Jakarta in 2007.

Fellow international bookstore chain Page One (headquartered in Singapore) began as the magazine agent for Kinokuniya but later became independent.

On September 22, 2017, Kinokuniya opened its first branch in Vietnam via Hanoi.

In March 2019, Kinokuniya's Singaporean branch announced that the Liang Court store will be closed on April 21, 2019,  while the Plaza Senayan outlet of Kinokuniya's Indonesian branch closed in April 1, 2021.

Overseas stores

Overseas, there are 29 stores in total. They are located in:

Arlington Heights, Illinois
New York City, New York
Little Tokyo, Los Angeles, California
Japantown, San Francisco, California
San Jose, California
Santa Monica, California
Torrance, California
Seattle, Washington
Beaverton, Oregon
Edgewater, New Jersey
Carrollton, Texas
Plano, Texas
Austin, Texas
Portland, Oregon
Katy, Texas 

AEON Mall Sen Sok, Phnom Penh

Sogo Plaza Senayan, Jakarta (store closed on April 1, 2021)
Seibu Grand Indonesia, Jakarta

Suria KLCC, Kuala Lumpur

 CentralWorld, Bangkok (Former Isetan Zone; Isetan Department Store closed on August 31, 2020 while Kinokuniya Bookstore still open as usual)
 Siam Paragon, Bangkok
 EmQuartier, Bangkok (Relocated from Emporium)

The Galeries Victoria, Sydney, New South Wales

Breeze Center, Taipei
Dayeh Takashimaya Department Store, Tianmu, Taipei (closed March 2022)
Kuan San Sogo, Taichung
Hanshin Arena Shopping Plaza, Kaohsiung

Dubai, Dubai Mall- It is advertised under the title 'Book World by Kinokuniya'.
Abu Dhabi, The Galleria, Al Maryah Island

Ngee Ann City, Orchard Road
Bugis Junction, Bugis
Liang Court, Clarke Quay (store closed on April 21, 2019)
JEM, Jurong East (store closed on May 9, 2022)

Mitsukoshi Mall, Bonifacio Global City, Taguig (store opened on November 17, 2022)

See also

References

External links

  
  

Book publishing companies in Tokyo
Bookstores of Japan
Meguro
Multinational companies headquartered in Japan
Publishing companies established in 1927
Retail companies established in 1927
Japanese companies established in 1927